Peter Davidson may refer to:

 Peter B. Davidson, General Counsel of the United States Department of Commerce
 Peter Davidson (footballer) (born 1963), Australian rules footballer
 Peter Wylie Davidson (1870–1963), Scottish sculptor and silversmith
 Pete Davidson (born 1993), American comedian
 "Pete Davidson" (song), Ariana Grande song
 Peter Davidson (1837–1915), Scottish occultist and Freemason Hermetic Brotherhood of Luxor
 Peter Davidson (architect), co-founder of Lab Architecture Studio
 Peter Davidson, comic artist on Desperate Dan

See also
Peter Davison (disambiguation)